Lorena Martínez Rodríguez (born 2 September 1964) is a Mexican politician from the Institutional Revolutionary Party. She has served as Deputy of the LVIII and LX Legislatures of the Mexican Congress representing Aguascalientes.

See also
 List of mayors of Aguascalientes

References

1964 births
Living people
People from Zacatecas City
Women members of the Chamber of Deputies (Mexico)
Institutional Revolutionary Party politicians
21st-century Mexican politicians
21st-century Mexican women politicians
Autonomous University of Aguascalientes alumni
Academic staff of the Autonomous University of Aguascalientes
Politicians from Zacatecas
Municipal presidents of Aguascalientes
Deputies of the LX Legislature of Mexico
Members of the Chamber of Deputies (Mexico) for Aguascalientes